François Maistre (14 May 1925 – 16 May 2016) was a French film, television and theatre actor. Born in Demigny, Saône-et-Loire, France, he appeared in nearly 100 films between 1960 and 2003. His father was singer and actor A.-M. Julien.

Selected filmography

 Le 7eme jour de Saint-Malo (1960)
 Les Jeux de l'amour (1960) – L'homme élégant
 The Joker (1960) – André Laroche
 Le bal des espions (1960)
 Napoleon II, the Eagle (1961) – Fürst Metternich
 Famous Love Affairs (1961) – Le commissaire Massot (segment "Jenny de Lacour")
 Paris Belongs to Us (1961) – Pierre Goupil
 The Immoral Moment (1962) – Patrice de Laborde
 À fleur de peau (1962) – Le commissaire
 Blague dans le coin (1963) – Sammy Bradford
 Thank You, Natercia (1963) – L'avoué
 À couteaux tirés (196) – Le médecin
 Angélique, Marquise des Anges (1964) – Le prince de Condé
 The Shameless Old Lady (1965) – Gaston
 Marvelous Angelique (1965) – Prionce de Condé
 Furia à Bahia pour OSS 117 (1965) – Carlos
 Four Queens for an Ace (1966) – Hakim Gregory
 Belle de Jour (1967) – L'enseignant
 Casse-tête chinois pour le judoka (1967) – Dragon
 La Louve solitaire (1968) – Davenport
 The Milky Way (1969) – Le curé fou / French Priest
 Last Leap (1970) – (uncredited)
 Distracted (1970) – Monsieur Gastier
 The Discreet Charm of the Bourgeoisie (1972) – Inspector Delecluze
 Night Flight from Moscow (1973) – Inspector Joss – Airport Police
 La punition (1973) – Le promoteur
 The Phantom of Liberty (1974) – Le professeur des gendarmes / Professor
 The Tiger Brigades (1974, TV series) – Faivre, le patron
 Innocents with Dirty Hands (1975) – Le commissaire Lamy
 Section spéciale (1975) – Marquis Fernand de Brinon, – le délégué général de Vichy
 Chronicle of the Years of Fire (1975) – Le contremaître de la carrière
 La Bulle (1975) – Le chef
 Les beaux messieurs de Bois-Doré (1976–1977, TV Mini-Series) – L'abbé Poulain
 Jaroslaw Dabrowski (1976) – Louis Adolphe Thiers
 Les conquistadores (1976)
 Le trouble-fesses (1976) – Don Pasquale
 Violette Nozière (1978) – Monsieur Mayeul
 Qu'il est joli garçon l'assassin de papa (1979) – Don Diègue
 Mamito (1980) – Monsieur Laurence
 Vivre libre ou mourir (1980) – Le procureur de la République
 Engrenage (1980) – Corbert
 Fais gaffe à la gaffe ! (1981) – Dumoulin
 Une glace avec deux boules... (1982) – François Dalbion
 Arrêt sur image (1987) – L'oncle d'Alice
 Story of Women (1988) – Le président Lamarre-Coudray
 Rouget le Braconnier (1989) – Père Rouget
 Madame Bovary (1991) – Lieuvain – le conseiller de la préfecture
 The Flower of Evil (2003) – Jules

References

External links

1925 births
2016 deaths
People from Saône-et-Loire
French male film actors
French male television actors
French male stage actors
20th-century French male actors